The Montrose Air Station Heritage Centre is located to the North of Montrose, Angus, Scotland. Montrose has the distinction of having the first operational military airfield in Great Britain and the Heritage Centre is located on the former airfield. It aims to show the human side of its history with a collection of contemporary photographs, artefacts and memorabilia. These not only tell of the history of the airfield but also the story of the men and women who served there and those who lived in the area.

The Air Station Heritage Centre is run by the Ian McIntosh Memorial Trust and is a registered Scottish charitable organisation. It is self-financing, relying on visitors fees and donations together with grants from local government and the Heritage Lottery Fund. The centre receives no regular financial support from local or national government.

History

The airfield was first opened on 1913 when five aircraft of No.2 Squadron Royal Flying Corps arrived. Montrose became the first operational military airfield in Great Britain and first military airfield in Scotland.

The air station closed in 1920 but was reopened in 1935 for use in the Second World War. After the war the airfield continued to be used as a maintenance unit until it closed on 4 June 1952.

In 1983 a group of local enthusiast banded together to ensure that the history of Montrose Air Station would not be forgotten. A local man, Ian McIntosh, established the Montrose Air Station Heritage Trust, now known as the Ian McIntosh Memorial Trust and money was raised by the Montrose Aerodrome Museum Society.

In 1992 the trust purchased the Watch Office and ground which became the Montrose Air Station Museum. Over the years the museum has added more buildings to house its increasing collection of artefacts, memorabilia and models aided by donations, local government grants and the Heritage Lottery Fund.

On 19 May 2012 a memorial stone was unveiled at the air station in remembrance of the units and personnel who were stationed there. The memorial was provided by the Airfields of Britain Conservation Trust.

Projects

Training Pilots for War
This project was supported by the Heritage Lottery Fund  as well as local benefactors. It commenced in June 2010 and involved extending the Romney Building to create room for new facilities. These included a Link Trainer, computer flight simulator and a learning zone with audio and video resources. It was completed in October 2012.

The Spitfire Fund
Similar to the wartime Spitfire Funds  this was to raise money to purchase a full size replica Spitfire. Additional funding from Angus Council  has enabled the purchase of the Spitfire which now sits at the front of the main building. The Aircraft, made by GB Replicas, stands as a monument to the many people who served there during two World Wars. It is in the colours and markings of the 602 Squadron (City of Glasgow) Red Lichtie Spitfire. The original Red Lichtie was purchased in 1942 by the people of Arbroath, Angus after they started a Spitfire fund and raised £5000.
On 26 July 2013 HRH Prince Edward, Earl of Wessex visited the Heritage Centre and unveiled the Spitfire and a commemorative stone.

First in France 1914
The first pilot to land in France after the declaration of war was Lieutenant H.D. Harvey-Kelly of No.2 Squadron RFC Montrose. The project is named after this event. A new building has been erected which will house the centre’s artefacts from World War I including the Robertson Cross and the replica Sopwith Camel. They have also constructed a full size replica B.E.2a aircraft and put together a comprehensive exhibition. Also part of this project will involve the production of a Roll of Honour, an 'online' Book of Remembrance for pilots who were killed in accidents whilst flying at Montrose Air Station. The First in France 1914 project is supported by the Heritage Lottery Fund.

Awards
Montrose Air Station Heritage Centre is a member of Museums Galleries Scotland and fully accredited Museum.

In 2009 The Montrose Air Station Heritage Centre was highly commended in the Cultural Ambassador category of the Angus Ambassador Awards.
In 2011 Montrose Air Station Heritage Centre won the Cultural Ambassador category and was highly commended in the Community Ambassador category.
In 2012 Montrose Air Station Heritage Centre was highly commended in the Tourism Ambassador category.
17 April 2014, Montrose Air Station Heritage Centre was given a Civic Award for Excellence in Civic Design by The Montrose Society. This was for the renovation of a World War II timber building to create a visitor reception area. 
2 June 2014, Montrose Air Station Heritage Centre was proud to have conferred upon it the Queen's Award for Voluntary Service.
September 2014, Montrose Air Station Heritage Centre was a finalist in the Community Champion category of the Sunday Mail Great Scot Awards.
May 2015, Montrose Air Station Heritage Centre awarded TripAdvisor Certificate of Excellence for consistently great reviews.
May 2016, Montrose Air Station Heritage Centre awarded TripAdvisor Certificate of Excellence for consistently great reviews.
June 2017, Montrose Air Station Heritage Centre awarded TripAdvisor Certificate of Excellence for consistently great reviews.
May 2018, Montrose Air Station Heritage Centre awarded TripAdvisor Certificate of Excellence for consistently great reviews.
May 2019, Montrose Air Station Heritage Centre awarded its fifth TripAdvisor Certificate of Excellence for consistently great reviews.

Exhibits

Aircraft on display
Royal Aircraft Factory B.E.2a replica representing No.471 of No.2 Squadron RFC as flown by Major Harvey Kelly DSO
Sopwith Camel F.1 replica representing B7320 of No.70 Squadron RFC as flown by WWI fighter ace Captain John Todd MBE MC DFC
Miles M.2H Hawk Major (DG590) Civilian Registration was G-ADMW
Avro Anson Mk.C19 No.TX266 on display whilst under renovation.
Supermarine Spitfire MkVb full size replica LO-D (EP121) No.602 (City of Glasgow) Squadron RAF 
Gloster Meteor T.7 (WF825) from No.603 (City of Edinburgh) Squadron RAF
de Havilland Sea Vampire T.22 (XA 109)
Hawker Hunter F.1  (WT619).
Panavia Tornado GR4  (ZD744).

Engines on display
Rolls-Royce Merlin aero engine
Rolls-Royce Derwent jet engine
Rolls-Royce Spey jet engine
Rolls-Royce Olympus jet engine
Turbo-Union RB199 jet engine
De Havilland Gipsy Queen   aero engine
Bristol Hercules radial engine – No 210016 series 264
Bristol Hercules radial engine – No 210391 series 264

Other items
Link Trainer
Bofors 40 mm Automatic Gun L/70 Anti Aircraft gun
1941 David Brown Taskmaster World War II Airfield Tractor
Robertson Cross

Buildings

MT Hut
The MT (Mechanised Transport) Hut can be seen in some of the oldest pictures of the air station and dates back to around 1915. After the closure of the air station in 1952 the hut fell into a state of disrepair. In 2009 volunteers started restoring the hut and it was formally reopened on 5 May 2012. The building is a category:C(S) Listed Building Historic Scotland Building ID: 38231

HQ Building
Built in 1915 this was the former headquarters building of the air station and now holds several exhibitions. The building is a category:C(S) Listed Building Historic Scotland Building ID: 38229

Exhibition Room 1
Formerly the Commanding Officers office, there is a display on the theme of the Home Front during World War II

Exhibition Room 2
Is used for temporary displays.

Exhibition Room 3
The largest display room tells the story of Montrose Air Station from its foundation in 1913 to its closure in 1952 and the people who served there. A new acquisition for 2013 is a large Diorama showing the layout of the airfield in 1940.

Exhibition Room 4
A pilots bedroom in 1940.

Wartime Pillbox and Anderson Shelter
The pillbox dates from 1949 and was an important part of the defences at Montrose.
The Anderson shelter was designed in 1938 by William Paterson and Oscar Carl (Karl) Kerrison in response to a request from the Home Office. It was named after Sir John Anderson, then Lord Privy Seal with special responsibility for preparing air-raid precautions immediately prior to the outbreak of World War II, and it was he who then initiated the development of the shelter. It was widely used by the civilian population during World War II

The Richard Moss Memorial Collection
Formerly the Kirriemuir Aviation Museum, this building displays Richard Moss’s collection of RAF memorabilia.

Jack Drummond Workshop and Store
This is named after LAC Jack Drummond who was posted to Montrose in 1937. The Nissen hut is used for restoration projects and houses working machinery. For safety reasons it is not open to the public.

John Betty Library and Research Centre
Named after Squadron Leader John Betty, former Chief Flying Instructor at RAF Montrose, the library houses the largest private collection of aviation books in Scotland and the Heritage Centre’s archives. It is accessible to visitors by arrangement and will eventually provide computer access to archives in the future for family history research.

David Butler Building
This building, a Romney Hut funded by the Heritage Lottery Fund, was named after David Butler who was a founder member of the Heritage Centre. It houses the Miles M.2H Hawk Major, T.22 de Havilland Sea Vampire and link trainer together with a display of aircraft engines. There is also a Pilot Training Display and a Learning Zone for visits from local schools.

Lt John Ross Robertson Building
The Heritage Centre's newest building was erected in July 2014 and funded by the Heritage Lottery Fund. It was officially opened by the Lord Lieutenant of Angus, Mrs Georgiana Osborne, on 3 August 2014. The Heritage Centres World War I artefacts are on display in the building together with its full size replica B.E.2a and Sopwith Camel aircraft. The building is named after Lt Robertson who learned to fly at Montrose and was killed in action on his fourth mission 5 months later on 12 May 1917. He was buried by the Germans and the cross they made for his grave is now on display in the building. It stands as a memorial not just for Lt Robertson but to all the people who served at Montrose.

Major Burke's Shed 1.b
On 14 January 2019 Heritage Centre entered into a long-term agreement with Angus Council for use of Major Burke's Shed 1.b.  Sheds 1.a and 1.b form the first of three hangars build in late 1913. The hanger contains a Panavia Tornado GR4  (ZD744). and a Hawker Hunter F.1 (WF619) on loan from the RAF Museum

Historic airfield buildings nearby
To the immediate south of the Heritage Centre stand three aircraft hangars which are believed to be the oldest known example of their type in the world. The hangars were built at the end of 1913 and first used in early 1914 to house No. 2 Squadron when they moved to the airfield from Upper Dysart. Their design was based on Indian Army Sheds modified by Major Burke to house aircraft and were pre-fabricated in Glasgow before being transported to Montrose. The buildings were constructed of wood with corrugated iron roofs and each one had two gabled openings. The hangars were built in a curve following the path of railway line which used to be at the rear of the buildings.

The hangar farthest away from the heritage centre retains its original cladding. The building is a category:A Listed Building Historic Scotland Building ID: 38228

The other two hangars have had a steel cladding added in 1987-8 and on the 10 August 2018 were relisted from category:B to category:A in recognition of their historical importance   Historic Scotland Building ID: 38227

See also

List of aerospace museums
RAF Montrose
Royal Flying Corps

References

External links
Official website
Montrose Air Station Heritage Centre on Facebook
Montrose Air Station Heritage Centre on Tripadvisor

Museums in Angus, Scotland
Aerospace museums in Scotland
Military and war museums in Scotland
Science museums in Scotland
Local museums in Scotland
History of Angus, Scotland
Category A listed buildings in Angus, Scotland
Category B listed buildings in Angus, Scotland
Reportedly haunted locations in Scotland
Military aviation museums in the United Kingdom
Royal Flying Corps
World War I
World War II museums
Montrose, Angus